The 1971 Fresno State Bulldogs football team represented Fresno State College—now known as California State University, Fresno—as a member of the Pacific Coast Athletic Association (PCAA) during the 1971 NCAA University Division football season. Led by sixth-year head coach Darryl Rogers, the Fresno State compiled an overall record of 6–5 with a mark of 3–2 in conference play, placing third in the PCAA. The Bulldogs played their home games at Ratcliffe Stadium on the campus of Fresno City College in Fresno, California.

At the end of the season, a charity bowl game was played to benefit the children of three Cal State Fullerton coaches and a pilot who had been killed in an airplane crash a month earlier. The game was called Mercy Bowl II, and was played on December 11 at the Los Angeles Memorial Coliseum.

Schedule

References

Fresno State
Fresno State Bulldogs football seasons
Fresno State Bulldogs football